The 1981–82 Kentucky Wildcats men's basketball team represented University of Kentucky in the 1981–82 NCAA Division I men's basketball season. The head coach was Joe B. Hall and the team finished the season with an overall record of 22–8.

References 

Kentucky Wildcats men's basketball seasons
Kentucky
Kentucky
Kentucky Wildcats
Kentucky Wildcats